Charles Mander may refer to:

Sir Charles Tertius Mander (1852–1929), British manufacturer, philanthropist and public servant
Sir Charles Arthur Mander (1884–1952), British public servant, philanthropist, and manufacturer
Sir Charles Marcus Mander (1921–2006), British industrialist, property developer, landowner and farmer